The Codman Square District is a historic district in the Dorchester neighborhood of Boston, Massachusetts. It consists of four of the most prominent properties facing the main Codman Square intersection, where Talbot Avenue and Washington Street cross. The area has a long history as a major civic center in Dorchester, and is now one of the large neighborhood's major commercial hubs. The properties in the district include the 1806 Congregational Church (now known as Second Church of Dorchester), the 1904 Codman Square branch of the Boston Public Library, the former Girls Latin Academy building (built in 1900 as Dorchester High School), and the Lithgow Building, a commercial brick structure at the southeast corner of the junction that was built in 1899.

The district was listed on the National Register of Historic Places in 1983.

See also
National Register of Historic Places listings in southern Boston, Massachusetts

References

Historic districts in Suffolk County, Massachusetts
Dorchester, Boston
National Register of Historic Places in Boston
Historic districts on the National Register of Historic Places in Massachusetts